Saperda carcharias is a species of longhorn beetle.

Ecology
Saperda carcharias feeds almost exclusively on poplar trees, targeting the root zone.

Taxonomy
Saperda carcharias was first described in 1758, when Carl Linnaeus included it in the 10th edition of his , under the name Cerambyx carcharias. It was later chosen as the type species of a new genus, Saperda.

References

External links

carcharias
Beetles of Europe
Beetles of Asia
Beetles described in 1758
Taxa named by Carl Linnaeus